The Last Tree can refer to:

 The Last Tree (album), a 2006 album by Larkin Grimm
 The Last Tree (film), a 2019 British film